Dan Slott (born July 3, 1967) is an American comic book writer, known for his work on Marvel Comics books such as The Amazing Spider-Man, as well as She-Hulk, Silver Surfer, The Superior Spider-Man, Tony Stark: Iron Man, The Mighty Avengers, and Fantastic Four. His work for DC Comics includes the books Arkham Asylum: Living Hell and  Batman Adventures.

Career

Early writing
Dan Slott's first published work for Marvel was "Survival of the Hippest" in Mighty Mouse #10 and "To Bounce or Not to Bounce", an eight-page backup story in New Warriors Annual #1 both cover dated July 1991. He became the regular writer for Marvel's Ren & Stimpy comic book series with that series debut issue (Dec. 1992) and first wrote Spider-Man in an issue of Ren and Stimpy that saw Spider-Man in battle against the Powdered Toast Man. Following this, Slott wrote other children's comics, including DC's Scooby-Doo, Looney Tunes, and Powerpuff Girls. After work on Batman Adventures and Justice League Adventures, Slott was given the chance to pitch a series for DC. The resulting miniseries was Arkham Asylum: Living Hell with artist Ryan Sook in 2003. In 2004 he wrote the "4th Parallel" storyline for the Justice League which introduced the Red King; this story was published in 2007 in JLA Classified #32–36.

Marvel Comics

Arkham Asylums success led to Slott's return to Marvel in 2004 to launch a new She-Hulk series. The title focused on She-Hulk as a "superhuman lawyer" in the Marvel Universe. After relaunching in October 2005, the second series met with higher sales, and after tie-ins with crossover storylines "Civil War" and "World War Hulk", reached its highest numbers yet. In 2007 Slott left the title with volume 2 #21, and became one of the writers on The Amazing Spider-Man.

While She-Hulk was on hiatus in 2005, Slott penned the Spider-Man/Human Torch miniseries, which chronicled the friendship of the two characters over the years, with each issue paying tribute to a different era of Marvel Comics.

Slott gave the team the Great Lakes Avengers their first ever solo miniseries in GLA: Misassembled, which featured a character being killed in each issue. He made the first roster changes to the team since its inception by creating a new character, Grasshopper, and reviving an obscure one, Squirrel Girl. During this period, Slott signed an exclusive contract with Marvel. He has since returned to the GLA twice, first with the 2005 GLX-Mas Special, following a name change to the Great Lakes X-Men, and then again in the 2007 Deadpool/GLI Summer Fun Spectacular with co-writer Fabian Nicieza, to coincide with Marvel's Civil War: The Initiative branding.

At the end of 2005, Slott was assigned to write The Thing's first solo series in 20 years. It was not a sales success, and was canceled with issue #8, despite Slott's attempts to rally readers in a campaign he called "Pull My Thing." The eight issues have been released in a trade paperback entitled Idol of Millions, which sees the Thing and other heroes fighting deadly roller-coasters and other machines in Arcade's Murderworld.

Slott was the writer of Marvel's Avengers: The Initiative, which launched following the conclusion of the 2006–07 "Civil War" storyline. He was one of the four writers of the thrice-monthly The Amazing Spider-Man, a schedule which began in January 2008 following the controversial storyline "One More Day". 

Slott took over writing duties on The Mighty Avengers after writer Brian Michael Bendis' departure, starting with issue #21 and finishing with issue #36. He wrote the story for the Spider-Man: Shattered Dimensions video game which was released in September 2010.

In November 2010, Slott took over The Amazing Spider-Man as the sole writer, marking the comic book's change to a twice–monthly schedule, beginning with Slott's "Big Time" storyline.

The "Big Time" storyline ended with The Amazing Spider-Man #700, its final issue. While that issue's story, which involved the switching of Peter Parker's mind with that of Doctor Octopus, and ended with the death of Parker in Doctor Octopus' body and Octopus remaining in Parker's, generated controversy among fans, including death threats for Slott, it won the 2012 Diamond Gem Award for Top Dollar Comic of the Year. The comic book went through five printings, The next month saw the premiere of a new series, The Superior Spider-Man, written by Slott, and featuring the adventures of Spider-Man, now inhabited by the mind of Doctor Octopus. The first issue won the 2013 Diamond Gem Award for Comic Book of the Year Over $3.00. The Superior Spider-Man ended with issue #31, with Peter Parker back as Spider-Man, and lead to a relaunch of The Amazing Spider-Man in April 2014. The first issue of this new version of The Amazing Spider-Man is, according to Diamond Comics Distributors, "The Best Selling Comic of the 21st Century." In 2014, in the pages of The Amazing Spider-Man, Slott would go on to write Spider-Verse, a massive Spider-Man event teaming up "Every Spider-Man Ever". It was the first time that characters like Spider-Ham and the newly created Spider-Gwen would team up with Peter Parker, Miles Morales, Spider-Man Noir, Spider-Man 2099, and many other Spider-Men. This story would go on to be adapted as a cartoon mini-series in the Ultimate Spider-Man cartoon, and then in the Oscar Award-winning film, Spider-Man: Into the Spider-Verse.

Slott and artist Mike Allred launched a new Silver Surfer series in May 2014. In 2016, Slott and Allred's Silver Surfer #11 won the Eisner Award for "Best Single Issue".

In 2018, Slott finished his ten year-plus run on The Amazing Spider-Man. He wrote his last major storyline, titled Go Down Swinging, from issue #797–800, which detailed Spider-Man fighting a Carnage-bonded Green Goblin. After that, he finished his run with his final issue being #801. After finishing his run on The Amazing Spider-Man, Slott began writing Tony Stark: Iron Man and Fantastic Four. 2018 ended with Slott writing four of the Top 10 selling issues for the entire industry, taking the #2, #4, #8, and #10 spots.

In January 2020, when Diamond Comics released its list of the Top 100 Best-Selling Comics of the Decade, nine of the titles were ones written by Slott: The Amazing Spider-Man #1 (2014), The Amazing Spider-Man #800, Fantastic Four #1 (2018), The Amazing Spider-Man #700, The Amazing Spider-Man #1 (2015), The Amazing Spider-Man #798, Superior Spider-Man #1, The Amazing Spider-Man: Renew Your Vows #1, and The Amazing Spider-Man #799.

In July 2022, it was announced that Slott would return full time to the Spider-Man franchise in October of that year, teaming with veteran Spider-Man artist Mark Bagley for the first time. Their title, simply called Spider-Man, will be a monthly ongoing which will connect to the status quo of the  Amazing Spider-Man run from Zeb Wells and John Romita Jr. The first storyline for the issue will be The End of Spider-Verse, the climatic chapter of the Spider-Verse trilogy begun in 2014 and furthered with Spider-Geddon in 2018.

Personal life
Slott lives in New York City. In 2021, Slott apologized on Twitter regarding his comics involving Spider-man character Silk for "playing into racial stereotypes" and that "those story choices were a mistake".

Bibliography
 2099 Unlimited #7, Marvel Comics, 1995
 A+X #1, Marvel Comics, 2012
 collected in A+X Equals Awesome
 AVX: Versus #6, Marvel Comics, 2012
 collected in Avengers Vs. X-Men
 collected in AVX: Versus
 Acclaim Adventure Zone Digests #1–3, Acclaim Comics, 1997
 Age of Heroes #1–4, Marvel Comics, 2010
 The Heroic Age trade paperback collects Age of Heroes #1
 Age of Heroes collects #1–4
 The Unbeatable Squirrel Girl Vol.2: Squirrel You Know It's True collects #3
 also collected in The Unbeatable Squirrel Girl & The Great Lakes Avengers
 Avengers The Initiative: The Complete Collection Vol. 2 collects #2 and #4
 All-New Marvel Now! Point One #1 Marvel Comics, 2014
 collected in Silver Surfer: New Dawn
 collected in Silver Surfer by Slott & Allred Omnibus
 Amazing Fantasy (volume 2) #15, Marvel Comics, 2005
 collected in The Mighty Avengers: Dark Reign
 The Amazing Spider-Man #546–548, 559–561, 564, 568–573, 581–582, 590–591, 600, 618–621,647–660, 662–676, 678–700, 789–801 Marvel Comics, 2008–2012, 2017–2018
 Spider-Man: Through the Decades collects #546
 Marvel Firsts: Before Marvel NOW! collects #546
 True Believers: Spider-Man BND #1 collects #546
 Spider-Man: Brand New Day Vol. 1 collects #546–548 (with Spider-Man: Swing Shift and Venom Super Special #1)
 Spider-Man: Brand New Day Vol. 3 collects #559–561
 Spider-Man: Kraven's First Hunt collects #564
 Spider-Man: Brand New Day The Complete Collection Vol.1 collects #546–548, 559–561, #564 (with Spider-Man: Swing Shift)
 Spider-Man: New Ways To Die collects #568–573
 Spider-Man: With Great Power Comes Great Responsibility #7 collects #568
 Spider-Man: Brand New Day The Complete Collection Vol.2 collects #568–573
 Spider-Man: Death and Dating collects #581–582
 Spider-Man: 24/7 collects #590–591
 Spider-Man: Brand New Day The Complete Collection Vol.3 collects #581–582, #590-#591
 Spider-Man: Died in Your Arms Tonight collects #600
 Spider-Man: Brand New Day The Complete Collection Vol.4 collects #600
 Spider-Man: The Gauntlet Book 2: Rhino & Mysterio collects #618–621
 Spider-Man: Origin of the Species collects #647
 Spider-Man: Big Time collects #648–651
 Spider-Man: Matters of Life and Death collects #652–654, #654.1, and #655–657
 Marvel Point One collects #654.1
 Venom: Flashpoint collects #654 and #654.1
 Guardians of the Galaxy Vol.3 collects #654
 Spider-Man: The Fantastic Spider-Man collects #658–662 (2011)
 Spider-Man: Big Time Ultimate Collection collects #648–662, and #654.1 (2012)
 Spider-Man: The Return of Anti-Venom collects #663–665, plus backups from #660 and #662–665
 Amazing Spider-Man: Spider-Island: Infested collects backups from #660 and #662–665
 Spider-Man: Spider-Island collects #666–673 and backups from #660 and #662–665
 Spider-Man: Flying Blind collects #674–676
 Spider-Man: Big Time Ultimate Collection Vol.2 collects #663–676 (2013)
 Spider-Man: Trouble on the Horizon collects #678–681 and #679.1
 Spider-Man: Ends of the Earth collects #682–687
 Spider-Man: Big Time Ultimate Collection Vol.3 collects #677–687 and #679.1 (2015)
 Spider-Man: Lizard – No Turning Back collects #688–691
 Spider-Man: Danger Zone collects #692–697
 Spider-Man: Big Time Ultimate Collection Vol.4 collects #688–697 (2015)
 Spider-Man: Dying Wish collects #698–700
 Morbius The Living Vampire: The Man Called Morbius collects #699.1
 Superior Spider-Man: Volume 1 collects #698–700
 Marvel 75th Anniversary Omnibus collects #700
 Free Comic Book Day 2007: The Amazing Spider-Man #1, (Free Comic Book Day issue), Marvel Comics, May 2007
 collected in The Amazing Spider-Man: Swing Shift: Director's Cut (with new material), 2008
 collected in Spider-Man: Brand New Day Vol. 1
 collected in Spider-Man: Brand New Day The Complete Collection Vol. 1
 Free Comic Book Day 2011: The Amazing Spider-Man #1, (Free Comic Book Day issue), Marvel Comics, May 2011
 collected in Spider-Man: The Return of Anti-Venom
 collected in Spider-Man: Big Time Ultimate Collection Vol.2 (2013)
 The Amazing Spider-Man Extra #2
 collected in Anti-Venom: New Ways to Live
The Amazing Spider-Man vol.3 #1–18 Marvel Comics, 2014–2015
 Amazing Spider-Man: The Parker Luck collects #1–6
 Amazing Spider-Man: Learning to Crawl collects #1.1–1.5
 Amazing Spider-Man: Spider-Verse Prelude collects #7–8
 Amazing Spider-Man: Spider-Verse collects #9–15
 Amazing Spider-Man: Graveyard Shift collects #16–18
 Original Sin collects #4–6
 Spider-Verse collects #7–15
 Ms. Marvel: Last Days collects #7–8
 Ms. Marvel Vol.2 collects #7–8
 Amazing Spider-Man Vol.1 hardcover collects #1–6, and #1.1–1.5
 Amazing Spider-Man Vol.2 hardcover collects #7–18 (along w/ FCBD 2014: Guardians of the Galaxy #1 and Superior Spider-Man #32–33)
 Free Comic Book Day 2014: Guardians of the Galaxy/Spider-Verse #1, (Free Comic Book Day issue), Marvel Comics, May 2014
 collected in Amazing Spider-Man: Spider-Verse Prelude
 collected in Spider-Verse hardcover
The Amazing Spider-Man: Renew Your Vows #1–5 Marvel Comics (2015)
 collected in Amazing Spider-Man: Renew Your Vows trade paperback
The Amazing Spider-Man vol.4 #1–32, Marvel Comics, 2015–2017
 Amazing Spider-Man: Worldwide Vol.1 collects #1–5
 Amazing Spider-Man: Worldwide Vol.2 collects #6–11
 Animaniacs #15, 16, 18, DC Comics, 1996
 Arkham Asylum: Living Hell #1–6, DC Comics, 2003
 collected in Arkham Asylum: Living Hell trade paperback
 collected in Arkham Asylum: Living Hell: Deluxe Edition hardcover
 Avengers: The Initiative Annual #1, Special #1, #1–12 and #14–20, Marvel Comics, 2007–2009
 Basic Training collects 1–6
 World War Hulk: X-Men collects 4–5
 Secret Invasion: Infiltration collects the last story from Annual #1
 Killed in Action collects 7–12, Annual #1
 Secret Invasion collects 14–19
 Avengers The Initiative: Disassembled collects #20
 Siege collects the Trauma short story from Avengers: The Initiative Special #1
 Skrulls Must Die! The Complete Skrull Kill Krew collects #16–19
 Avengers The Initiative: The Complete Collection Vol. 1 collects #1-#19 and Annual #1
 Avengers The Initiative: The Complete Collection Vol. 2 collects #20 and Special #1
 Avenging Spider-Man #8, Marvel Comics
 collected in Spider-Man: Ends of the Earth
 collected in Spider-Man: Big Time Ultimate Collection Vol.3
 Batman Adventures #1–8 and #10–14 (with Ty Templeton), DC Comics, 2003–2004
 Batman Adventures #1 reprinted in Batman Adventures Free Comic Book Day 2003
 Batman Adventures #1 reprinted in Batman/Scooby-Doo ComicFest 2012
 digest Batman Adventures: Rogues Gallery collects issues #1–4
 digest Batman Adventures: Shadows & Masks collects issues #5–8
 "Learn Spanish with Batman: Rogues Gallery" collects issues #1–4 Berlitz
 "Learn Spanish with Batman: Shadows & Masks" collects issues #5–8 Berlitz
 Batman: Double Trouble, Scholastic Books, 2005
 Batman: Gotham Adventures #58, DC Comics, 2003
 Big Max #1, Mr. Comics, 2006
 Cartoon Network Presents #3 and #21, DC Comics/Cartoon Network, 1997 and 1999
 Cartoon Network Starring Cow and Chicken #3, 7, and 13, DC Comics/Cartoon Network, 1999–2000
 digest Cartoon Cartoons: Volume 2 – The Gang's All Here! includes Cow and Chicken #7, DC Comics/Cartoon Network
 Dexter's Laboratory #4 and #14, DC Comics, 1999–2000
 digest "Cartoon Cartoons: Volume 1 – Name That Toon" includes Dexter's Laboratory #4, DC Comics/Cartoon Network
 Dexter's Laboratory Classics: Volume 1 includes Dexter's Laboratory #4, IDW
 Dark Reign: The List: The Amazing Spider-Man Marvel Comics, 2010
 collected in Dark Reign: The List
 collected in Spider-Man: The Gauntlet, Book 1
 Disney's Aladdin #2 and #11, Marvel Comics, 1994–1995
 trade paperback "Disney's Aladdin" includes #2
 Doc Samson #1–4, Marvel Comics, 1996
 Earthworm Jim #1–3, Marvel Comics, 1995
 Excalibur #68, Marvel Comics, 1993
 Fantastic Four vol.6 #1-46, Marvel Comics, 2018
 Fantastic Four Wedding Special #1, Marvel Comics, 2018
 Great Lakes Avengers #1–4, Marvel Comics, 2005
 trade paperback G.L.A. Misassembled collects four-issue limited series, 2005
 GLX-Mas Special, 2005
 collected in Marvel Holiday Magazine 2010
 collected in The Unbeatable Squirrel Girl Vol.2: Squirrel You Know It's True
 Deadpool/GLI Summer Fun Spectacular, with Fabian Nicieza, 2007
 collected in Deadpool & Cable Ultimate Collection Book 3
 collected in Deadpool & Cable Omnibus
 The Unbeatable Squirrel Girl & The GLA, collects GLA:Misassembled #1–4, GLX-Mas Special, and Deadpool/GLA Summer Fun Spectacular.
 Gross Point #2, 5, and 7, DC Comics, 1997–1998
 Guardians of the Galaxy: Free Comic Book Day 2014, Marvel Comics, 2014 (Spider-Verse prelude back-up story)
 Incoming, Marvel Comics, 2019
 Iron Man 2020 #1–6 , Marvel Comics, 2020
 JLA Classified #32–36, DC Comics, 2007
 JLA: Secret Files and Origins, DC Comics, 2004
 Justice League Adventures #4, 6, 11, and 13, DC Comics, 2002–2003
 trade paperback Justice League Adventures includes #6, 11, and 13
 digest The Magnificent Seven includes #6 and 11
 digest Friends & Foes includes #13
 Looney Tunes #13, 20, 25, 26, 44, 47, 49 – 52, 57, 59, 62, 65, 70, 75, 89, 93, 100, 104, 129, 171, 182, and 247 DC Comics, 1995–2019
 Bugs Bunny & Friends: A Comic Celebration includes the stories from issues #44 and 47
 Marvel #1000, Marvel Comics 2019
 Marvel Comics Presents #89, 93, 98, 99, 116, 119, 129, 130, 132–136, 148, and 156, Marvel Comics, 1991–1994
 trade paperback Marvel Visionaries: Gil Kane includes #116, featuring the Two-Gun Kid
 trade paperback Captain Universe: Power Unimaginable includes #148
 trade paperback Destroyer includes #156
 Marvel Swimsuit Special 1992–1993, Marvel Comics
 material from Marvel Swimsuit Special '93 collected in X-Men: A Skinning of Souls
 material from Marvel Swimsuit Special '93 collected in The Infinity War: Aftermath
 Marvel Tales #256, Marvel Comics, 1991
 Marvel Universe: Ultimate Spider-Man #1, Marvel Comics, 2012
 collected in Marvel Universe: Ultimate Spider-Man Reader #1
 collected in Marvel Universe: Ultimate Spider-Man Digest Vol. #1
 reprinted in Spider-Man/Avengers ComicFest 2012
 reprinted in Ultimate Spider-Man ComicFest 2013
 reprinted in Marvel Comics Digest:Starring Spider-Man #1 2017
 Marvel Year in Review 1991 – 1993, Marvel Comics,
 material from Marvel Year in Review '93 collected in X-Men: A Skinning of Souls
 Midnight Sons Unlimited #9, Marvel Comics, 1995
 collected in Destroyer
 The Mighty Avengers #21–36, Marvel Comics, 2009–2010
 Avengers: I am an Avenger II collects #21
 The Mighty Avengers: Earth's Mightiest collects #21–26 (along with Secret Invasion Requiem material)
 The Mighty Avengers: The Unspoken collects #27–31
 Siege collects #32–36
 The Mighty Avengers: Dark Reign collects #21–36
 Mighty Marvel Westerns: Two-Gun Kid, Marvel Comics, 2006
 included in Mighty Marvel Westerns hardcover
 Mighty Mouse #10, Marvel Comics, 1991
 New Warriors Annual #1, Marvel Comics, 1991
 collected in New Warriors Classic Vol.2
 collected in New Warriors Omnibus Vol.1
 Night Thrasher #13–14, Marvel Comics, 1994
 Nights into Dreams... #1–4, Archie Comics, 1998
 The Original Ghost Rider #3, 5–12, 15, and 19, Marvel Comics, 1992–1994 (backup stories featuring Phantom Rider)
 Original Sins #3, Marvel Comics, 2014
 collected in Original Sin
 Pinky and the Brain #3–4, DC Comics, 1996
 Power Pack Holiday Special #1, Marvel Comics, 1992
 The Powerpuff Girls #34, DC Comics, 2003
 collected in Powerpuff Girls: Go, Girls, Go!
 The Punisher Back to School Special #2, Marvel Comics, 1993
 The Punisher Summer Special #1, Marvel Comics, 1991
 collected in The Punisher: Eternal War
 The Ren and Stimpy Show, 1–13, 15, 17–19 Marvel Comics, 1992–1995
 Pick of the Litter trade paperback collects issues 1–4
 Tastes Like Chicken trade paperback collects issues 5–8
 Don't Try This at Home trade paperback collects issues 9–12
 Your Pals trade paperback collects issues 13–16
 Sick Little Monkeys trade paperback collects issues 17–20
 The Ren and Stimpy Show: Holiday Special 1994
 The Ren and Stimpy Show Special #3: Masters of Time and Space, 1994
 The Ren and Stimpy Show: Eenteractive Special, 1995
 Powdered Toast Man Special #1–2, 1994–1995
 Saban's Powerhouse Digest (w/ Power Rangers Turbo and Masked Rider) #1–2, Acclaim Comics,1997
 Scooby-Doo #5 and #50, DC Comics/Cartoon Network, 1997 and 2001
 story from issue 5 included in Scooby-Doo – Volume One: You Meddling Kids! digest
 Secret Invasion: Requiem #1, Marvel Comics, 2009
 collected in The Mighty Avengers: Earth's Mightiest
 collected in The Mighty Avengers: Dark Reign
 collected in The Avengers: The Many Faces of Henry Pym
 Shadowland: Spider-Man #1, Marvel Comics, 2010
 collected in Shadowland: Street Heroes
 She-Hulk (volume 1) 1–12, (volume 2) 1–21, Marvel Comics, 2004–2007
 Single Green Female collects volume 1 – issues 1–6
 Superhuman Law collects volume 1 – issues 7–12
 issue #10 is also included in Secret Wars Omnibus
 Time Trials collects volume 2 – issues 1–5
 She-Hulk by Dan Slott: The Complete Collection Volume 1 collects volume 1 – issues 1–12 and volume 2 – issues 1–5
 Laws of Attraction collects volume 2 – issues 6–13
 issue #8 is also included in Civil War: Marvel Universe trade paperback
 issue #8 is also included in Civil War: Fantastic Four hardcover
 Planet Without a Hulk collects volume 2 – issues 14–21
 She-Hulk by Dan Slott: The Complete Collection Volume 2 collects volume 2 – issues 6–21
 Silver Surfer vol. 7 #1–15 Marvel Comics, 2014–2015
 Silver Surfer: New Dawn collects #1–5
 Silver Surfer: Worlds Apart collects #6–10
 Silver Surfer: Last Days collects #11–15
 Secret Wars: Last Days of the Marvel Universe collects #11–15
 Silver Surfer by Slott & Allred Omnibus collects #1–15 
 Silver Surfer vol. 8 #1–14 Marvel Comics, 2016–2017
 Silver Surfer: Citizen of Earth collects #1–6
 Silver Surfer: A Power Greater Than Cosmic collects #7–14
 Silver Surfer by Slott & Allred Omnibus collects #1–14 
 Sleepwalker #25, Marvel Comics, 1993
 Sonic the Hedgehog Super Special #8 and #12, Archie Comics, 1999–2000
 collected in Sonic Select: Book 4
 Spider-Island: Deadly Foes #1, Marvel Comics, 2011
 collected in Spider-Man: Spider-Island
 collected in Spider-Man: Big Time Ultimate Collection Vol. 2 (2013)
 Spider-Man/Human Torch #1–5, Marvel Comics, 2005
 collected as Spider-Man/Human Torch: I'm With Stupid digest
 collected as Spider-Man & The Human Torch hardcover 2009
 collected in The Thing & The Human Torch trade paperback 2018
 Spider-Man Magazine For Kids – Fall, Marvel Comics, 1996
 Spider-Verse #1–2, Marvel Comics, 2014
 collected in Spider-Verse hardcover
 "It's the Little Things" from Spider-Verse #2 collected in Amazing Spider-Man: Renew Your Vows trade paperback
 The Superior Spider-Man #1–33 Marvel Comics, 2013–2014
 issues #1–5 collected in Superior Spider-Man: My Own Worst Enemy
 issues #1–5 collected in Superior Spider-Man: Vol. 1.
 issue #1 collected in Marvel NOW! Omnibus
 issue #1 collected in Spider-Man Firsts
 issues #6–10 collected in Superior Spider-Man: A Troubled Mind
 issues #11–16 collected in Superior Spider-Man: No Escape
 issues #6–16 collected in Superior Spider-Man: Vol. 2.
 issues #17–21 collected in Superior Spider-Man: Necessary Evil
 issues #21–26 collected in Superior Spider-Man: Superior Venom
 issues #27–31 collected in Superior Spider-Man: Goblin Nation
 issues #32–33 collected in Amazing Spider-Man: Spider-Verse Prelude
 issues #32–33 collected in Spider-Verse hardcover
 Superman Adventures #40 and #57, DC Comics, 1999 and 2001
 issue #40 collected in Superman Adventures: Man of Steel 2013
 Teenage Mutant Ninja Turtles Adventures: Year of the Turtle #1–3, Archie Comics, 1996
 The Thing #1–8, Marvel Comics, 2005–2006
 collected as The Thing: Idol of Millions trade paperback
 collected in The Thing & The Human Torch trade paperback 2018
 trade paperback Pet Avengers Classic includes issue #4
 Lockjaw: Dog Days#1 collects issue #4
 trade paperback The Unbeatable Squirrel Girl Vol.2: Squirrel You Know It's True includes issue #8
 trade paperback The Unbeatable Squirrel Girl & The Great Lakes Avengers includes issue #8
 Tomb Raider #50, Top Cow/Image Comics, 2005
 Tomb Raider Compendium Edition includes this story (miscredited)
 Tomb Raider: Tankōbon Vol.5 includes this story (miscredited)
 Tomb Raider Archive Vol.3 includes this story (correctly credited)
 Tony Stark: Iron Man #1–11, #14–19  Marvel Comics, 2018–2019
 Troublemakers #16, Acclaim Comics, 1998
 Venom Super Special #1, Marvel Comics, 1995
 collected in Spider-Man: Brand New Day Vol.1
 What If...? (volume 2) #52 and #63, 1993–1994
 What The--?! #23 and #26, Marvel Comics, 1993–1994
 Wolverine #102.5, Marvel Comics, 1996
 collected in Young Marvel: Little X-Men, Little Avengers, Big Trouble
 Wonder Man Annual #2, Marvel Comics, 1993
 X-Force Annual #1, Marvel Comics, 1992
 collected in X-Force: Under the Gun
 X-Men Annual #1, Marvel Comics, 1992

References

External links

 
 Dan Slott at Mike's Amazing World of Comics
 Dan Slott at the Unofficial Handbook of Marvel Comics Creators
 ComiXology podcast with Dan Slott on The Amazing Spider-Man "Brand New Day"
 Interviews with Dan Slott, Fanboy Radio

1967 births
American comics writers
Jewish American writers
Jewish American artists
Living people
Marvel Comics writers
Marvel Comics people
DC Comics people
Place of birth missing (living people)
Inkpot Award winners